Glenwood, Maryland may refer to:
Glenwood, Harford County, Maryland, an unincorporated community in Harford County
Glenwood, Howard County, Maryland, an unincorporated community in Howard County